Jan-Lukas Funke (born 20 July 1999) is a German footballer.

References

Living people
1999 births
Association football defenders
German footballers
RB Leipzig players
TSV 1860 Munich players
Eintracht Braunschweig players
Eintracht Braunschweig II players
FC Viktoria Köln players
3. Liga players
Regionalliga players